Tamil Nadu Electricity Licensing Board is an organisation of the state Government of Tamil Nadu in India. The organisation is responsible for issuing and renewing competence certificates and licences to contractors.

History and role
The Licensing Board was established under the provisions of the Indian Electricity Rules 1956. The Chief Electrical Inspector to Government is the President of the Licensing Board.

References

1955 establishments in Madras State
Government agencies established in 1955
State electricity agencies of India
Energy in Tamil Nadu
Organisations based in Chennai
State agencies of Tamil Nadu